Theekshana Ratnasekera (born July 1, 1982) is a Sri Lankan former swimmer, who specialized in sprint freestyle events. She represented Sri Lanka, as an 18-year-old teen, at the 2000 Summer Olympics, and also held numerous age group and meet records in a sprint freestyle (both 50 and 100 m). Ratnasekera lost the race in the pre-Olympic selection to Radiesha Daluwatte, the teenage daughter of former Sri Lankan army commander Rohan Daluwatte, and the General filed a petition in the Court of Appeals to challenge the sports officials' decision to send Ratnasekera to the Olympics.

Ratnasekera competed only in the women's 50 m freestyle at the 2000 Summer Olympics in Sydney. She received a ticket from FINA, under a Universality program, in an entry time of 29.90. Swimming in heat two, she held off a sprint battle against six other swimmers to overhaul a 30-second barrier and hit the wall first in a sterling time and a Sri Lankan record of 29.88. Ratnasekera's effortless triumph was not enough to put her through to the semifinals, as she placed sixty-fourth overall in the prelims.

References

External links
 

1982 births
Living people
Sri Lankan female swimmers
Olympic swimmers of Sri Lanka
Swimmers at the 2000 Summer Olympics
Sri Lankan female freestyle swimmers
Swimmers from Colombo
South Asian Games bronze medalists for Sri Lanka
South Asian Games medalists in swimming